John Caldicott Cavell (12 January 1813 – 5 February 1887) was a department store proprietor and mayor of Oxford, England.

John Cavell was born in Bardwell, Suffolk, the son of  Charles and Sarah Cavell, He married Sarah Elliston of Summertown, Oxford on 9 April 1835, at the age of 22. She was the sister of Jesse Elliston, who owned a draper's shop in central Oxford. Elliston made John Cavell a partner and the shop became known as Elliston & Cavell. This went on to become the largest department store in Oxford.

Mayor of Oxford
Cavell became a city councillor in 1860 and an Alderman in 1868. He was also Mayor of Oxford in 1865–6, 1877–8 and briefly in 1879–80.

Cavell's funeral took place at St Mary Magdalen Church on 10 February 1887. It was attended by 1,500–2,000 mourners. He was buried in St Sepulchre's Cemetery off Walton Street.

References 
 John Caldicott Cavell, Mayor of Oxford

1813 births
1887 deaths
English businesspeople in retailing
Debenhams
Mayors of Oxford
People from Bardwell, Suffolk
19th-century English businesspeople
Burials at St Sepulchre's Cemetery